Al-Nilin Mosque (or The Mosque of the two Niles  ) is a mosque in Omdurman, Sudan. It is located on the western banks of the Nile river, just opposite to the confluence of the two Niles. It was built in the 1970s during the Nimeiry era of Sudan, and since then remains one of the fine architectural religious venues in the country.

History 
The design of the mosque was a thesis project by Gamer Eldawla Eltahir, a student at the University of Khartoum. It was selected for construction by the president of Sudan Jaafar Nimeiry. The mosque was completed in 1984.

See also
  Lists of mosques 
  List of mosques in Africa
  List of mosques in Egypt

References 

20th-century mosques
Mosques in Sudan
Omdurman
Mosques completed in the 1970s